FICO (legal name: Fair Isaac Corporation), originally Fair, Isaac and Company, is a data analytics company based in Bozeman, Montana, focused on credit scoring services. It was founded by Bill Fair and Earl Isaac in 1956. Its FICO score, a measure of consumer credit risk, has become a fixture of consumer lending in the United States.

In 2013, lenders purchased more than 10 billion FICO scores and about 30 million American consumers accessed their scores themselves. The company reported a revenue of $1.29 billion dollars for the fiscal year of 2020.

History 
FICO was founded in 1956 as Fair, Isaac and Company by engineer William R. "Bill" Fair and mathematician Earl Judson Isaac. The two met while working at the Stanford Research Institute in Menlo Park, California. Selling its first credit scoring system two years after the company's creation, FICO pitched its system to fifty American lenders.

FICO went public in 1986 and is traded on the New York Stock Exchange. The company debuted its first general-purpose FICO score in 1989. FICO scores are based on credit reports and "base" FICO scores range from 300 to 850, while industry-specific scores range from 250 to 900.

Lenders use the scores to gauge a potential borrower's creditworthiness.

Fannie Mae and Freddie Mac first began using FICO scores to help determine which American consumers qualified for mortgages bought and sold by the companies in 1995.

Name changes
Originally called Fair, Isaac and Company (hence the abbreviation FICO), this name was changed to Fair Isaac Corporation in 2003.

Headquarters moves
Originally based in San Rafael, California, FICO moved its headquarters to Minneapolis, Minnesota, in 2004, a few years after Minnesota resident Thomas Grudnowski took over as CEO. In 2013, it moved its headquarters to San Jose, California, a year after CEO William Lansing joined. In 2016 it opened an office in Bozeman, Montana which later became its headquarters.

Acquisitions
DynaMark 1992
Risk Management Technologies 1997
Prevision 1997
Nykamp Consulting Group 2001
HNC Software 2002
NAREX 2003
Diversified Healthcare Services 2003
Seurat (2003)
London Bridge Software 2004
Braun Consulting 2004
RulesPower 2005
Dash Optimization 2008
Entiera 2012
Adeptra 2012
CR Software 2012
Infoglide 2013
InfoCentricity 2014
Karmasphere 2014
TONBELLER AG 2015
QuadMetrics 2016
GoOn 2018
EZMCOM 2019

Operations
FICO is headquartered in Bozeman, Montana and it has additional U.S. locations in San Jose, California; Roseville, Minnesota; San Diego; San Rafael, California; Fairfax, Virginia; and Austin, Texas.

The company has international locations in Australia, Brazil, Canada, China, Germany, India, Italy, Japan, Korea, Lithuania, Poland, Malaysia, the Philippines, Russia, Singapore, South Africa, Spain, Taiwan, Thailand, Turkey and the United Kingdom.

FICO score 

A measure of credit risk, FICO scores are available through all of the major consumer reporting agencies in the United States: Equifax, Experian, and TransUnion. FICO scores are also offered in other markets, including Mexico and Canada, as well as through the fourth U.S. credit reporting bureau, PRBC.

References

External links 
 

How Does FICO Calculate a Score?

Business intelligence companies
Business software companies
Companies listed on the New York Stock Exchange
Data mining and machine learning software
Data visualization software
Financial services companies based in California
Companies based in San Jose, California
Financial technology companies
Multinational companies headquartered in the United States
Software companies based in the San Francisco Bay Area
Software companies based in Montana
American companies established in 1956
Business services companies established in 1956
Financial services companies established in 1956
Computer companies established in 1956
Credit scoring
1956 establishments in California
1980s initial public offerings
Software companies of the United States
Bozeman, Montana